The 2016–17 Arizona Coyotes season was the 38th season for the National Hockey League franchise that was established on June 22, 1979, the 21st season since the franchise relocated from Winnipeg following the 1995–96 NHL season, and the 45th overall, including the World Hockey Association years.

This season marked the end of the Shane Doan era, as he retired from the NHL after playing 21 seasons for the Winnipeg Jets-Phoenix/Arizona Coyotes franchise. Doan was the last remaining active player from the original Winnipeg Jets team, following Teemu Selanne's retirement in 2014.

Standings

Schedule and results

Pre-season

Regular season

Playoffs 
The Coyotes missed the playoffs for the fifth consecutive year.

Player statistics 
Final stats

Goaltenders

†Denotes player spent time with another team before joining the Coyotes. Stats reflect time with the Coyotes only.
‡Traded mid-season
Bold/italics denotes franchise record

Transactions
The Coyotes have been involved in the following transactions during the 2016–17 season.

Trades

Free agents acquired

Free agents lost

Claimed via waivers

Lost via waivers

Lost via retirement

Player signings
The following players were signed by the Coyotes. Two-way contracts are marked with an asterisk (*).

Draft picks

Below are the Arizona Coyotes' selections at the 2016 NHL Entry Draft, to be held on June 24–25, 2016, at the First Niagara Center in Buffalo.

Draft notes
  The Detroit Red Wings' first-round pick went to the Arizona Coyotes as the result of a trade on June 24, 2016, that sent Joe Vitale, the Rangers' first-round pick and a compensatory second-round pick both in 2016 (20th and 53rd overall) to Detroit in exchange for Pavel Datsyuk and this pick.
 The Arizona Coyotes' second-round pick went to the Tampa Bay Lightning as the result of a trade on June 25, 2016, that sent Anthony DeAngelo to Arizona in exchange for this pick.
 The Arizona Coyotes' compensatory second-round pick (53rd overall) went to the Detroit Red Wings as the result of a trade on June 24, 2016, that sent Pavel Datsyuk and a first-round pick in 2016 (16th overall) to Arizona in exchange for Joe Vitale, the Rangers' first-round pick in 2016 (20th overall) and this pick.
Arizona previously received this pick as compensation for not signing 2014 first-round draft pick Conner Bleackley, whom they acquired in an earlier trade with Colorado.
 The Arizona Coyotes' fourth-round pick went to the New York Rangers as the result of a trade on March 1, 2015, that sent John Moore, Anthony Duclair, Tampa Bay's second-round pick in 2015 and a conditional first-round pick in 2016 to Arizona in exchange for Keith Yandle, Chris Summers and this pick.
 The Arizona Coyotes' fifth-round pick went to the Dallas Stars as the result of a trade on June 16, 2016, that sent Alex Goligoski to Arizona in exchange for this pick.

References

Arizona Coyotes seasons
Arizona Coyotes
Arizona Coyotes
Arizona Coyotes